China has an upper middle income developing mixed socialist market economy that incorporates industrial policies and strategic five-year plans. It has the world's second largest economy by nominal GDP, totaling around US$18.321 trillion in 2022, and the world's largest economy since 2016 when measured by purchasing power parity (PPP). China accounted for 18.6% of global economy in 2022 in PPP terms, and around 18% in nominal terms in 2022. Historically, China was one of the world's foremost economic powers for most of the two millennia from the 1st until the 19th century.  The economy consists of public sector enterprise, state-owned enterprises (SOEs) and mixed-ownership enterprises, as well as a large domestic private sector and openness to foreign businesses in a system. It recently overtook the economy of the European Union in 2021.

China is the world's largest manufacturing economy and exporter of goods. It is also the world's fastest-growing consumer market and second-largest importer of goods. China is also the world's largest consumer of numerous commodities, and accounts for about half of global consumption of metals. China is a net importer of services products. It is the largest trading nation in the world and plays a prominent role in international trade. China is the largest recipient of foreign direct investment in the world as of 2020, receiving inflows of $163billion. It has the second largest outward foreign direct investment, at US$136.91 billion for 2019 alone, following Japan at US$226.65billion for the same period. As of 2021, China was second in the world in total number of billionaires. In 2018, it was second in millionaires with 3.5 million. According to the 2019 Global Wealth Report by Credit Suisse Group, China surpassed the US in the wealth of the top ten percent of the world's population. China has the world's largest foreign-exchange reserves worth $3.1trillion, but if the foreign assets of China's state-owned commercial banks are included, the value of China's reserves rises to nearly $4trillion.

With 778 million workers, the Chinese labor force was the world's largest as of 2020. It ranks 28th on the Global Competitiveness Report. Per the Global Innovation Index in 2022, China was ranked 11th, 3rd in Asia & Oceania region and 2nd for countries with a population of over 100 million. It is the only middle-income economy and the only newly industrialized economy in the top 30. China ranks No.1 globally in patents, utility models, trademarks, industrial designs, and creative goods exports. It also has two (Shenzhen-Hong Kong-Guangzhou and Beijing in the 2nd and 3rd spots respectively) of the global top5 science and technology clusters, which is more than any other country. As of March 2022, China has over 500 million 5G users and 1.45 million base stations installed. Almost 493 million Chinese people are categorised as middle class, and 242 million are upper middle class, according to a 2021 Pew Research Center survey. 

China is the only major economy to have avoided the COVID-19 economic decline; recovery efforts are sluggish due to persistent inequalities in poverty and other institutional problems; state-sponsored economic controls; and a difficult real estate market. China sustained growth due to export relations, its manufacturing sector, and low-wage workers. China has four of the world's top ten most competitive financial centers and three of the world's ten largest stock exchanges (both by market capitalization and by trade volume). China's economy is both a contributor to rising global greenhouse gas (GHG) emissions causing climate change and severely affected by its adverse impacts.

History

Historically, China was one of the world's foremost economic powers for most of the two millennia from the 1st until the 19th century. China accounted for around one-quarter of the global GDP until the late 1700s and approximately one-third of the global GDP in 1820 as the Industrial Revolution was beginning in Great Britain. China's GDP in 1820 was six times as large as Britain's, the largest economy in Europeand almost twenty times the GDP of the nascent United States.

The government began its economic reforms in 1978 under the leadership of Deng Xiaoping. As a result, China has the world's fastest-growing major economy, with growth rates averaging 10% over 30 years. Currently, many scholars consider the Chinese economic model as an example of authoritarian capitalism, state capitalism or party-state capitalism.

Wealth in China 

China has had the world's largest middle class population since 2015, and the middle class grew to a size of 400 million by 2018 and is projected to reach 1.2 billion by 2027, making up one fourth of the world total. As of 2018, China was first in the world in total number of billionaires and second in millionairesthere were 658 Chinese billionaires and 3.5 million millionaires. In 2019, China overtook the US as the home to the highest number of rich people in the world, according to the global wealth report by Credit Suisse. In other words, as of 2019, a hundred million Chinese are in the top ten percent of the wealthiest individuals in the worldthose who have a net personal wealth of at least $110,000. In 2020, China has the world's highest number of billionaires, which is more than the US and India combined, and as of March 2021, the number of billionaires in China reach 1,058 with the combined wealth of US$4.5trillion. According to the Hurun Global Rich List 2021, China is home to six of the world's top ten cities (Beijing, Shanghai, Shenzhen, Hong Kong, Hangzhou and Guangzhou in the 1st, 2nd, 4th, 5th, 8th and 9th spots, respectively) by the highest number of billionaires, which is more than any other country. As of January 2021, China had 85 female billionaires, two-thirds of the global total.

According to the IMF, on a per capita income basis, China ranked 59th by GDP (nominal) and 73rd by GDP (PPP) in 2020. China ranked 3rd by GDP per capita (nominal) and 5th by GDP per capita (PPP) among countries with a population of over 100 million.

State-owned enterprises 

China's SOEs perform important functions that benefit the state. Academic Wendy Leutert writes, "They contribute to central and local governments revenues through dividends and taxes, support urban employment, keep key input prices low, channel capital towards targeted industries and technologies, support sub-national redistribution to poorer interior and western provinces, and aid the state's response to natural disasters, financial crises and social instability."

As of 2017, China has more SOEs than any other country, and the most SOEs among large national companies.

State-owned enterprises accounted for over 60% of China's market capitalization in 2019 and generated 40% of China's GDP of US$15.98trillion dollars (101.36 trillion yuan) in 2020, with domestic and foreign private businesses and investment accounting for the remaining 60%. As of the end of 2019, the total assets of all China's SOEs, including those operating in the financial sector, reached US$58.97trillion In 2015. Ninety-one (91) of these SOEs belong to the 2020 Fortune Global 500 companies.

Regional economies for China

China's unequal transportation system, combined with important differences in the availability of natural and human resources and in industrial infrastructure, has produced significant variations in the regional economies of China.

Economic development has generally been more rapid in coastal provinces than in the interior and there are large disparities in per capita income between regions. The three wealthiest regions are the Yangtze River Delta in East China; the Pearl River Delta in South China; and Jingjinji region in North China. It is the rapid development of these areas that is expected to have the most significant effect on the Asian regional economy as a whole and Chinese government policy is designed to remove the obstacles to accelerated growth in these wealthier regions. By 2035, China's four cities (Shanghai, Beijing, Guangzhou and Shenzhen) are projected to be among the global top ten largest cities by nominal GDP according to a report by Oxford Economics.

GDP by administrative division

Hong Kong and Macau

In accordance with the One country, two systems policy, the economies of the former British colony of Hong Kong and Portuguese colony of Macau are separate from the rest of China and each other. Both Hong Kong and Macau are free to conduct and engage in economic negotiations with foreign countries, as well as participating as full members in various international economic organizations such as the World Customs Organization, the World Trade Organization and the Asia-Pacific Economic Cooperation forum, often under the names "Hong Kong, China" and "Macau, China".

Development

The economic reforms implemented in 1978 helped to propel China into the ranks of the world's major economic powers. The economic development of Shenzhen has caused the city to be referred to as the world's next Silicon Valley. The provinces in the coastal regions of China tend to be more industrialized while regions in the hinterland are less developed.

To guide economic development, the Chinese central government adopts "five-year plans" that detail its economic priorities and essential policies. The Fourteenth Five-Year Plan (2021–2025) is currently being implemented, placing an emphasis on consumption-driven growth and technological self-sufficiency while China transitions from being an upper middle-income economy to a high-income economy. The public sector plays a central role in China's economy. This development is also in line with the planning goals of the Chinese central government to achieve the "Two Centenaries", namely the material goal of China becoming a "moderately prosperous society in all respects" by 2021 and the modernization goal of China becoming a "fully developed nation" by 2049, the 100th anniversary of the founding of the People's Republic.

Like Japan and South Korea before it, China's economy has grown rapidly, raising the income levels and living standards of its citizens while producing goods that are consumed globally. Between 1981 and 2019, the  percentage of the population living in extreme poverty decreased from 88.1% to 0.2%. Its current account surplus increased by a factor of 53 between 1982 and 2015, from $5.7billion to $304billion. During this time, China also became an industrial powerhouse, moving beyond initial successes in low-wage sectors like clothing and footwear to the increasingly sophisticated production of computers, pharmaceuticals, and automobiles. China's factories generated $3.7trillion real manufacturing value added, more than the US, South Korea, Germany and the UK combined. China's manufacturing sector benefits from the world's largest domestic market, immense manufacturing scale, and highly developed manufacturing supply chains.

In mid-2014 China announced it was taking steps to boost the economy, which at the time was running at a rate 7.4% per annum, but was slowing. The measures included plans to build a multi-tier transport network, comprising railways, roads and airports, to create a new economic belt alongside the Yangtze River. In 2021, it was reported that China's GDP could continue to grow on an average of 5.9% annually until 2025, according to the Centre for Economic and Business Research, which also predicts that China will overtake the US economy by the end of the decade.

Disputes over economic data
There exists disputes over reliability of official economic data. Foreign and some Chinese sources have claimed that official Chinese government statistics overstate China's economic growth. However, several Western academics and institutions have stated that China's economic growth is higher than indicated by official figures. Others, such as the Economist Intelligence Unit, state that while there's evidence China's GDP data is "smoothed", they believe that China's nominal and real GDP data are broadly accurate.

Overestimating 
Chinese provinces and cities have long been suspected of cooking their numbers, with the focus on local government officials, whose performance are often assessed based on how well their respective economies have performed. In recent years, China claimed growth numbers have come under increased scrutiny, with both domestic and international observers alleging the government has been inflating its economic output.

A 2015 survey by The Wall Street Journal of 64 select economists found that 96% of respondents think China's GDP estimates don't "accurately reflect the state of the Chinese economy." However, more than half the economists in the survey estimated that China's annual growth was somewhere in the 5% to 7% range, which represents robust growth.
Chinese premier Li Keqiang has said he is far from confident in the country's GDP estimates, calling them "man-made" and unreliable, according to a leaked document from 2007 obtained by WikiLeaks. He said government data releases, especially the GDP numbers, should be used "for reference only".

Analysts like Wilbur Ross and Donald Straszheim believe China's recent economic growth has been overstated, and estimate a growth rate at around 4% or less. According to Chang-Tai Hsieh, an economist at the University of Chicago Booth School of Business and research associate at the National Bureau of Economic Research, Michael Zheng Song, an economics professor at the Chinese University of Hong Kong, and coauthors, China's economy was smaller than what the Chinese government stated in 2016. In their research paper, published by the Brookings Institution, they adjusted the historical GDP time series using value-added tax data, which they said are "highly resistant to fraud and tampering". They found that China's economic growth may have been overstated by 1.7 percent each year between 2008 and 2016, meaning that the government may have been overstating the size of the Chinese economy by 12–16 percent in 2016.

Issues with underestimating 
Several Western academics and institutions have supported the claim that China's economy is likely to be underestimated. A paper by the US-based National Bureau of Economic Research claimed that China's economic growth may be higher than what is reported by official statistics. An article by Hunter Clarka, Maxim Pinkovskiya and Xavier Sala-i-Martin published by the Elsevier Science Direct in 2018 employs an innovative method of satellite-recorded nighttime lights, which the authors claim to be a best-unbiased predictor of the economic growth in Chinese cities. The results suggest that the Chinese economic growth rate is higher than the official reported data.

The Li Keqiang index is an alternative measurement of Chinese economic performance that uses three variables Li preferred. Satellite measurements of light pollution are used by some analysts to model Chinese economic growth and suggest recent growth rate numbers in Chinese official data are more reliable although are likely to be smoothed. According to an article by the Federal Reserve Bank of St. Louis, China's official statistics are of a high quality compared to other developing, middle-income and low-income countries. In 2016, China was at the 83rd percentile of middle and low-income countries, up from the 38th percentile in 2004. A study by the Federal Reserve Bank of San Francisco found that China's official GDP statistics are "significantly and positively correlated" with externally verifiable measures of economic activity such as import and export data from China's trade partners, suggesting that China's economic growth was no slower than the official figures indicated.

The study by Daniel Rosen and Beibei Bao, published by the Center for Strategic and International Studies in 2015, showed that GDP in 2008 was actually 13–16 percent bigger than the official data, while 2013 GDP was accurately at $10.5trillion rather than the official figure at $9.5trillion. According to a research conducted by Arvind Subramanian, a former economist at the International Money Fund (IMF) and a senior fellow at the Peterson Institute for International Economics, the size of the Chinese economy by Purchasing Power Parity in 2010 was about $14.8 trillion rather than an official estimate at $10.1 trillion by IMF, meaning that China's GDP was underestimated by 47 percent.

Regional development

These strategies are aimed at the relatively poorer regions in China in an attempt to prevent widening inequalities:
 China Western Development, designed to increase the economic situation of the western provinces through investment and development of natural resources.
 Revitalize Northeast China, to rejuvenate the industrial bases in Northeast China. It covers the three provinces of Heilongjiang, Jilin, and Liaoning, as well as the five eastern prefectures of Inner Mongolia.
 Rise of Central China Plan, to accelerate the development of its central regions. It covers six provinces: Shanxi, Henan, Anhui, Hubei, Hunan, and Jiangxi.
 Third Front, focused on the southwestern provinces.

Foreign investment abroad:
 Go Global, to encourage its enterprises to invest overseas.

Macroeconomic trends

The following table shows the main economic indicators in 1980–2021 (with IMF staff stimtates in 2022–2027). Inflation below 5% is in green.

Inflation

During the winter of 2007–2008, inflation ran about 7% on an annual basis, rising to 8.7% in statistics for February 2008, released in March 2008.

Shortages of gasoline and diesel fuel developed in the fall of 2007 due to reluctance of refineries to produce fuel at low prices set by the state. These prices were slightly increased in November 2007 with fuel selling for $2.65 a gallon, still slightly below world prices. Price controls were in effect on numerous basic products and services, but were ineffective with food, prices of which were rising at an annual rate of 18.2% in November 2007. The problem of inflation has caused concern at the highest levels of the Chinese government. On 9January 2008, the government issued the following statement on its official website: "The Chinese government decided on Wednesday to take further measures to stabilize market prices and increase the severity of punishments for those guilty of driving up prices through hoarding or cheating."

Pork is an important part of the Chinese economy with a per capita consumption of 90 grams per day. The worldwide rise in the price of animal feed associated with increased production of ethanol from corn resulted in steep rises in pork prices in China in 2007. Increased cost of production interacted badly with increased demand resulting from rapidly rising wages. The state responded by subsidizing pork prices for students and the urban poor and called for increased production. Release of pork from the nation's strategic pork reserve was considered.

By January 2008, the inflation rate rose to 7.1%, which BBC News described as the highest inflation rate since 1997, due to the winter storms that month. China's inflation rate jumped to a new decade high of 8.7 percent in February 2008 after severe winter storms disrupted the economy and worsened food shortages, the government said 11 March 2008. Throughout the summer and fall, however, inflation fell again to a low of 6.6% in October 2008.

By November 2010, the inflation rate rose up to 5.1%, driven by an 11.7% increase in food prices year on year. According to the bureau, industrial output went up 13.3 percent. As supplies have run short, prices for fuel and other commodities have risen.

Investment cycles

Chinese investment has always been highly cyclical. Ever since the 1958 Great Leap Forward, growth in fixed capital formation has typically peaked about every five years. Recent peaks occurred in 1978, 1984, 1988, 1993, 2003 and 2009. The corresponding troughs were in 1981, 1986, 1989, 1997 and 2005.

In China, the majority of investment is carried out by entities that are at least partially state-owned. Most of these are under the control of local governments. Thus booms are primarily the result of perverse incentives at the local-government level. Unlike entrepreneurs in a free-enterprise economy, Chinese local officials are motivated primarily by political considerations. As their performance evaluations are based, to a large extent, on GDP growth within their jurisdictions, they have a strong incentive to promote large-scale investment projects. They also don't face any real bankruptcy risk. When localities get into trouble, they are invariably bailed out by state-owned banks. Under these circumstances, overinvestment is inevitable.

A typical cycle begins with a relaxation of central government credit and industrial policy. This allows local governments to push investment aggressively, both through state-sector entities they control directly and by offering investment-promotion incentives to private investors and enterprises outside their jurisdictions. The resulting boom puts upward pressure on prices and may also result in shortages of key inputs such as coal and electricity (as was the case in 2003). Once inflation has risen to a level at which it begins to threaten social stability, the central government will intervene by tightening enforcement of industrial and credit policy. Projects that went ahead without required approvals will be halted. Bank lending to particular types of investors will be restricted. Credit then becomes tight and investment growth begins to decline.

Eventually such centrally-imposed busts alleviate shortages and bring inflation down to acceptable levels. At that point, the central government yields to local-government demands for looser policy and the cycle begins again.

Macroeconomic issues

Environmental transition

Over the years, large subsidies were built into the price structure of certain commodities and these subsidies grew substantially in the late 1970s and 1980s.

By 2010, rapidly rising wages and a general increase in the standard of living had put increased energy use on a collision course with the need to reduce carbon emissions in order to control global warming. There were diligent efforts to increase energy efficiency and increase use of renewable sources; over 1,000 inefficient power plants had been closed, but projections continued to show a dramatic rise in carbon emissions from burning fossil fuels. Since the late 2010s, a reduction of state-backed subsidies has negatively impacted several Chinese companies, with BYD Auto being one of them.

While note the largest source of historical cumulative emissions China today accounts for one third of global greenhouse gas emissions. On a per capita basis, China's emissions in 2019 (9 tonnes CO2-equivalent [tCO2e] per year) surpass those of the European Union (7.6 tCO2e) but remain slightly below the Organisation for Economic Co-operation and Development (OECD) average (10.7 tCO2e) and well below the United States average (17.6 tCO2e). However, the carbon intensity of China's GDP—the amount of carbon used to generate a unit of output—remains relatively high. To avoid the long-term socioeconomic cost of environmental pollution in China, it has been suggested by Nicholas Stern and Fergus Green of the Grantham Research Institute on Climate Change and the Environment that the economy of China be shifted to more advanced industrial development with low carbon dioxide emissions and better allocation of national resources to innovation and R&D for sustainable economic growth in order to reduce the impact of China's heavy industry. This is in accord with the planning goals of the central government. Chinese leader and Communist Party general secretary Xi Jinping's Chinese Dream is described as achieving the "Two Centenaries", namely the material goal of China becoming a "moderately prosperous society" by 2021, and the modernization goal of China becoming a fully developed nation by 2049, the 100th anniversary of the founding of the People's Republic.

National debt

In 2014, many analysts expressed concern over the overall size of China's government debt. At the end of 2014, the International Monetary Fund reported that China's general government gross debt-to-GDP ratio was 41.44 percent. In 2015, a report by the International Monetary Fund concluded that China's public debt is relatively low "and on a stable path in all standard stress tests except for the scenario with contingent liability shocks", such as "a large-scale bank recapitalization or financial system bailout to deal, for example, with a potential rise in NPLs from deleveraging".

Chinese authorities have dismissed analysts' worries, insisting "the country still has room to increase government debt." Former Fed Chairman Ben Bernanke, earlier in 2016, commented that "the... debt pile facing China [is] an 'internal' problem, given the majority of the borrowings was issued in local currency. Many economists have expressed the same views as Bernanke. A 2019 survey by the OECD found that China's corporate debt is higher than other major countries.

"Shadow banking" has risen in China, posing risks to the financial system.

As of 2020, China's total government debt stands at approximately  46 trillion ( 7.0 trillion), equivalent to about 45% of GDP. In comparison, the United States had a government debt of about 28 trillion at the end of 2020, approximately 128% of GDP.

Regulatory environment and government revenues

Though China's economy has expanded rapidly, its regulatory environment has not kept pace. Since Deng Xiaoping's open market reforms, the growth of new businesses has outpaced the government's ability to regulate them. This has created a situation where businesses, faced with mounting competition and poor oversight, take drastic measures to increase profit margins, often at the expense of consumer safety. This issue became more prominent in 2007, with a number of restrictions being placed on problematic Chinese exports by the United States.

From the 1950s to the 1980s, the central government's revenues derived chiefly from the profits of the state enterprises, which were remitted to the state. Some government revenues also came from taxes, of which the most important was the general industrial and commercial tax.

The trend, however, has been for remitted profits of the state enterprises to be replaced with taxes on those profits. Initially, this tax system was adjusted so as to allow for differences in the market capitalization and pricing situations of various firms, but more-uniform tax schedules were introduced in the early 1990s. In addition, personal income and value-added taxes were implemented at that time.

Financial and banking system

Most of China's financial institutions are state-owned and governed. The chief instruments of financial and fiscal control are the People's Bank of China (PBC) and the Ministry of Finance, both under the authority of the State Council. The People's Bank of China replaced the Central Bank of China in 1950 and gradually took over private banks. It fulfills many of the functions of other central and commercial banks. It issues the currency, controls circulation, and plays an important role in disbursing budgetary expenditures. Additionally, it administers the accounts, payments, and receipts of government organizations and other bodies, which enables it to exert thorough supervision over their financial and general performances in consideration of the government's economic plans. The PBC is also responsible for international trade and other overseas transactions. Remittances by overseas Chinese are managed by the Bank of China (BOC), which has a number of branch offices in several countries.

Other financial institutions that are crucial, include the China Development Bank (CDB), which funds economic development and directs foreign investment; the Agricultural Bank of China (ABC), which provides for the agricultural sector; the China Construction Bank (CCB), which is responsible for capitalizing a portion of overall investment and for providing capital funds for certain industrial and construction enterprises; and the Industrial and Commercial Bank of China (ICBC), which conducts ordinary commercial transactions and acts as a savings bank for the public. China initiated the founding of the Asian Infrastructure Investment Bank in 2015 and the Silk Road Fund in 2014, an investment fund of the Chinese government to foster increased investment and provide financial supports in countries along the One Belt, One Road.

China's economic reforms greatly increased the economic role of the banking system. In theory any enterprises or individuals can go to the banks to obtain loans outside the state plan, in practice, 75% of state bank loans go to State Owned Enterprises. (SOEs) Even though nearly all investment capital was previously provided on a grant basis according to the state plan, policy has since the start of the reform shifted to a loan basis through the various state-directed financial institutions. It is estimated that, as of 2011, 14 trillion Yuan in loans was outstanding to local governments. Much of that total is believed by outside observers to be nonperforming. Increasing amounts of funds are made available through the banks for economic and commercial purposes. Foreign sources of capital have also increased. China has received loans from the World Bank and several United Nations programs, as well as from countries (particularly Japan) and, to a lesser extent, commercial banks. Hong Kong has been a major conduit of this investment, as well as a source itself. On 23 February 2012, the PBC evinced its inclination to liberalise its capital markets when it circulated a telling ten-year timetable. Following on the heels of this development, Shenzhen banks were able to launch cross-border yuan remittances for individuals, a significant shift in the PBC's capital control strictures since Chinese nationals had been previously barred from transferring their yuan to overseas account.

China has four of the world's top ten most competitive financial centers (Shanghai, Hong Kong, Beijing, and Shenzhen), more than any other country. China has three of the world's ten largest stock exchanges (Shanghai, Hong Kong and Shenzhen), both by market capitalization and by trade volume. As of 12 October 2020, the total market capitalization of Mainland Chinese stock markets, consisting of the Shanghai Stock Exchange and Shenzhen Stock Exchange, topped US$10trillion, excluding the Hong Kong Stock Exchange, with about US$5.9trillion.

As of the end of June 2020, foreign investors had bought a total of US$440billion in Chinese stocks, representing about 2.9% of the total value, and indicating that foreign investors scooped up a total of US$156.6billion in the stocks just in the first half of 2020. The total value of China's bond market topped US$15.4trillion, ranked above that of Japan and the U.K., and second only to that of the U.S. with US$40trillion, as of the beginning of September 2020. As of the end of September 2020, foreign holdings of Chinese bonds reached US$388billion, or 2.5%, of the total value, notwithstanding an increase by 44.66% year on year.

China has the world's largest total banking sector assets of around $45.838trillion (309.41trillion CNY) with $42.063trillion in total deposits and other liabilities.

Stock markets

As of 2014 and the first quarter of 2015, the financial industry had been providing about 1.5% of China's 7% annual growth rate.

Despite slowing of the economy, as of June 2015 the Chinese stock index, the CSI 300 Index, which is based on 300 stocks traded in the Shanghai and Shenzhen stock exchanges, had risen nearly 150% over the past twelve months. In an effort to forestall damage from collapse of a possible economic bubble fueled by margin trading the central government raised requirements for margin lending. Economic damage from a crash in 2007–2008 was limited due to margin lending being highly restricted. In early July, after a fall in the markets of nearly 30% from their 12 June highs, there were efforts by blue-chip, often state-owned, firms, the Chinese securities industry, and the central government to stabilize the market by buying back stock and increasing purchases of the stock of established firms; however, much of the volatility has been in smaller, less-established firms that had been heavily invested in by unsophisticated, often working class, investors who had purchased stock based solely on its rapid increase in valuation. 80% of Chinese stocks are owned by individual investors, many novices. As of 10 July 2015 efforts by the China Securities Finance Corporation, CFS, a firm created by China's commodities and stock exchanges to finance trades, had apparently stabilized the market. Major Chinese securities firms were required by the China Securities Regulatory Commission to buy, and hold, a substantial amount of securities affected by the downturn. Using funds supplied by the central bank and commercial banks the China Securities Finance Corporation purchased enough stocks to halt the slide acquiring as much as 5% of the stock in some firms. Lines of credit were extended by CFS to 21 securities firms, some of which also purchased up to 5% of some companies stocks. Some of the small cap stocks acquired may be overvalued.

Chinese stocks fell about 10% during the last week of July 2015 with record breaking losses on Monday.

Currency system

The renminbi ("people's currency") is the currency of China, denominated as the yuan, subdivided into 10jiao or 100fen. The renminbi is issued by the People's Bank of China, the monetary authority of China. The ISO 4217 abbreviation is CNY, although also commonly abbreviated as "RMB". As of 2005, the yuan was generally considered by outside observers to be undervalued by about 30–40%. However, in 2017, the IMF stated that the yuan was correctly valued.

The renminbi is held in a floating exchange-rate system managed primarily against the US dollar. On 21 July 2005, China revalued its currency by 2.1% against the US dollar and, since then has moved to an exchange rate system that references a basket of currencies and has allowed the renminbi to fluctuate at a daily rate of up to half a percent.

The rate of exchange (Chinese yuan per US$1) on 31 July 2008, was RMB 6.846, in mid-2007 was RMB 7.45, while in early 2006 was RMB 8.07:US$1=8.2793 yuan (January 2000), 8.2783 (1999), 8.2790 (1998), 8.2898 (1997), 8.3142 (1996), 8.3514 (1995).

There is a complex relationship between China's balance of trade, inflation, measured by the consumer price index and the value of its currency. Despite allowing the value of the yuan to "float", China's central bank has decisive ability to control its value with relationship to other currencies. Inflation in 2007, reflecting sharply rising prices for meat and fuel, is probably related to the worldwide rise in commodities used as animal feed or as fuel. Thus rapid rises in the value of the yuan permitted in December 2007 are possibly related to efforts to mitigate inflation by permitting the renminbi to be worth more. An article published in International Review of Economics & Finance in 2010 by Mete Feridun (University of Greenwich Business School) and his colleagues provide empirical evidence that financial development fosters economic growth in China.

During the week of 10 August 2015, against the background of a slowing Chinese economy and appreciation of the U.S. dollar, the People's Bank of China devalued the renminbi by about 5%. The devaluation was accomplished by pegging the official rate to closing market rates. A market-based "representative" exchange rate against the U.S. dollar is one of the requirements for designation of a currency as one with Special Drawing Rights (SDR) by the International Monetary Fund (IMF), one of China's goals. Since the late-2000s, China has sought to internationalize the renminbi. As of 2013, the RMB is the 8th most widely traded currency in the world. In November 2015 in advance of G-20 and IMF meetings, IMF director Christine Lagarde announced her support for adding the yuan to the SDR currency basket. The announcement gave 'green-light' to official approval at 30 November IMF meeting. The internationalization of the Chinese economy continues to affect the standardized economic forecast officially launched in China by the Purchasing Managers Index in 2005. As China's economy grows, so does China's Renminbi, which undergoes the process needed for its internationalization.

Sectors
Among the Fortune 500 companies in 2022, there are 136 in China. As of 2022, China was home to 351 largest listed companies measured by revenue in the Fortune Global 2000, ranking second globally. China is also home to more than two hundred privately held technology startups (tech unicorns), each with a valuation of over $1billion, the highest number in the world.

Agriculture

China is the world's largest producer and consumer of agricultural productsand some 300 million Chinese farm workers are in the industry, mostly laboring on pieces of land about the size of U.S. farms. Virtually all arable land is used for food crops. China is the world's largest producer of rice and is among the principal sources of wheat, corn (maize), tobacco, soybeans, potatoes, sorghum, peanuts, tea, millet, barley, oilseed, pork, and fish. Major non-food crops, including cotton, other fibers, and oilseeds, furnish China with a small proportion of its foreign trade revenue. Agricultural exports, such as vegetables and fruits, fish and shellfish, grain and meat products, are exported to Hong Kong. Yields are high because of intensive cultivation, for example, China's cropland area is only 75% of the U.S. total, but China still produces about 30% more crops and livestock than the United States. China hopes to further increase agricultural production through improved plant stocks, fertilizers, and technology.

According to the government statistics issued in 2005, after a drop in the yield of farm crops in 2000, output has been increasing annually.

According to the United Nations World Food Program, in 2003, China fed twenty percent of the world's population with only seven percent of the world's arable land. China ranks first worldwide in farm output, and, as a result of topographic and climatic factors, only about 10–15 percent of the total land area is suitable for cultivation. Of this, slightly more than half is unirrigated, and the remainder is divided roughly equally between paddy fields and irrigated areas. Nevertheless, about 60 percent of the population lives in the rural areas, and until the 1980s a high percentage of them made their living directly from farming. Since then, many have been encouraged to leave the fields and pursue other activities, such as light manufacturing, commerce, and transportation; and by the mid-1980s farming accounted for less than half of the value of rural output. Today, agriculture contributes only 13% of China's GDP.

Animal husbandry constitutes the second most important component of agricultural production. China is the world's leading producer of pigs, chickens, and eggs, and it also has sizable herds of sheep and cattle. Since the mid-1970s, greater emphasis has been placed on increasing the livestock output. China has a long tradition of ocean and freshwater fishing and of aquaculture. Pond raising has always been important and has been increasingly emphasized to supplement coastal and inland fisheries threatened by overfishing and to provide such valuable export commodities as prawns. China is also unmatched in the size and reach of its fishing armada with anywhere from 200,000 to 800,000 boats, some as far afield as Argentina. Fueled primarily by government subsidies, its growth and activities have largely gone unchecked.

Environmental problems such as floods, drought, and erosion pose serious threats to farming in many parts of the country. The wholesale destruction of forests gave way to an energetic reforestation program that proved inadequate, and forest resources are still fairly meagre. The principal forests are found in the Qin Mountains and the central mountains and on the Yunnan–Guizhou Plateau. Because they are inaccessible, the Qinling forests are not worked extensively, and much of the country's timber comes from Heilongjiang, Jilin, Sichuan, and Yunnan.

Western China, comprising Tibet, Xinjiang, and Qinghai, has little agricultural significance except for areas of floriculture and cattle raising. Rice, China's most important crop, is dominant in the southern provinces and many of the farms here yield two harvests a year. In the north, wheat is of the greatest importance, while in central China wheat and rice vie with each other for the top place. Millet and kaoliang (a variety of grain sorghum) are grown mainly in the northeast and some central provinces, which, together with some northern areas, also provide considerable quantities of barley. Most of the soybean crop is derived from the north and the northeast; corn (maize) is grown in the center and the north, while tea comes mainly from the warm and humid hilly areas of the south. Cotton is grown extensively in the central provinces, but it is also found to a lesser extent in the southeast and in the north. Tobacco comes from the center and parts of the south. Other important crops are potatoes, sugar beets, and oilseeds.

In the past decade, the government has been encouraging agricultural mechanization and land consolidation to raise yields and compensate for the loss of rural workers who have migrated to the cities. According to the most recent statistics by the UN Food and Agriculture Organization, the annual growth rate of agricultural mechanization in China is 6.38 percent. By 2014, the integrated mechanization rate had risen to nearly 60 percent, with the rate for wheat surpassing 90 percent and that for maize approaching 80 percent. In addition to standard agricultural equipment like tractors, China's agriculture cooperatives have begun using high-tech equipment, including unmanned aerial vehicles, which are used to spay crops with pesticides. Good progress has been made in increasing water conservancy, and about half the cultivated land is under irrigation.

In the late 1970s and early 1980s, economic reforms were introduced. First of all this began with the shift of farming work to a system of household responsibility and a phasing out of collectivized agriculture. Later this expanded to include a gradual liberalization of price controls; fiscal decentralization; massive privatization of state enterprises, thereby allowing a wide variety of private enterprises in the services and light manufacturing; the foundation of a diversified banking system (but with large amounts of state control); the development of a stock market; and the opening of the economy to increased foreign trade and foreign investment.

Housing and construction

The real estate industry is about 20% of the Chinese economy. Compared to other nations, investing in stock markets and other assets is harder due to currency controls within the country. As a result, many Chinese citizens own multiple properties, as they are one of the few ways in which it is comparatively easy to grow and preserve wealth. Due to this, many economists have speculated about a property bubble within the Chinese economy On 16 July 2020, the Wall Street Journal reported that the housing market within the Chinese economy had grown to US$52 trillion, eclipsing the US 2008 housing market before the Financial Crisis.

Despite the possibility of a housing bubble, many people still choose to invest their assets in real estate market. On 19 December 2021, according to a report by McKinsey Global Institute, China's net worth reached $120 trillion in 2020 to overtake the U.S.'s $89 trillion as a red-hot real estate market drove up property value.

Energy and mineral resources

Electricity:
 Production: 6.5 trillion kWh (2017)
 Consumption: 2.8248 trillion kWh (2006)
 Exports: 18.7 billion kwh (2015)
 Imports: 6.2 billion kwh (2015)

Electricity – production by source:
 Thermal: 70.4 (67.1% from coal) (2017)
 Hydro: 17.8% (2017)
 Renewables: 7.3% (2017)
 Nuclear: 3.8% (2017)
 Other: 0.7% (2017)

Oil:
 Production:  (2005)
 Consumption:  (2005) and expected  in 2030
 Exports:  (2005)
 Imports:  (2019) 
 Net imports:  (2005)
 Proved reserves:  (1 January 2006)

Natural gas:
 Production: 47.88 km3 (2005 est.)
 Consumption: 44.93 km3 (2005 est.)
 Exports: 2.944 km3 (2005)
 Imports: 0 m3 (2005)
 Proved reserves: 1,448 km3 (1 January 2006 est.)

Since 1980, China's energy production has grown dramatically, as has the proportion allocated to domestic consumption. Some 80 percent of all power is generated from fossil fuel at thermal plants, with about 17 percent at hydroelectric installations; only about two percent is from nuclear energy, mainly from plants located in Guangdong and Zhejiang. Though China has rich overall energy potential, most have yet to be developed. In addition, the geographical distribution of energy puts most of these resources relatively far from their major industrial users. Basically the northeast is rich in coal and oil, the central part of north China has abundant coal, and the southwest has immense hydroelectric potential. But the industrialized regions around Guangzhou and the Lower Yangtze region around Shanghai have too little energy, while there is relatively little heavy industry located near major energy resource areas other than in the southern part of the northeast.

Due in large part to environmental concerns, China has wanted to shift China's current energy mix from a heavy reliance on coal, which accounts for 70–75% of China's energy, toward greater reliance on oil, natural gas, renewable energy, and nuclear power. China has closed thousands of coal mines over the past five to ten years to cut overproduction. According to Chinese statistics, this has reduced coal production by over 25%.

Since 1993, China has been a net importer of oil, a large portion of which comes from the Middle East. Imported oil accounts for 20% of the processed crude in China. Net imports are expected to rise to 3.5 million barrels (560,000m3) per day by 2010. China is interested in diversifying the sources of its oil imports and has invested in oil fields around the world. China is developing oil imports from Central Asia and has invested in Kazakhstani oil fields. Beijing also plans to increase China's natural gas production, which currently accounts for only 3% of China's total energy consumption and incorporated a natural gas strategy in its 10th Five-Year Plan (2001–2005), with the goal of expanding gas use from a 2% share of total energy production to 4% by 2005 (gas accounts for 25% of U.S. energy production). Analysts expect China's consumption of natural gas to more than double by 2010.

The 11th Five-Year Program (2006–10), announced in 2005 and approved by the National People's Congress in March 2006, called for greater energy conservation measures, including development of renewable energy sources and increased attention to environmental protection. Guidelines called for a 20% reduction in energy consumption per unit of GDP by 2010. Moving away from coal towards cleaner energy sources including oil, natural gas, renewable energy, and nuclear power is an important component of China's development program. Beijing also intends to continue to improve energy efficiency and promote the use of clean coal technology. China has abundant hydroelectric resources; the Three Gorges Dam, for example, will have a total capacity of 18 gigawatts when fully on-line (projected for 2009). In addition, the share of electricity generated by nuclear power is projected to grow from 1% in 2000 to 5% in 2030. China's renewable energy law, which went into effect in 2006, calls for 10% of its energy to come from renewable energy sources by 2020.

As of 2021, China is facing its worst energy crisis in decades. The Guardian reported that "Companies in the industrial heartlands have been told to limit consumption, residents have been subjected to rolling blackouts, and annual light shows have been cancelled."

China has natural resources with an estimated worth of $23trillion, 90% of which are coal and rare earth metals.

Mining

Outdated mining and ore-processing technologies are being replaced with modern techniques, but China's rapid industrialization requires imports of minerals from abroad. In particular, iron ore imports from Australia and the United States have soared in the early 2000s as steel production rapidly outstripped domestic iron ore production. Also China has become increasingly active in several African countries to mine the reserves it requires for economic growth, particularly in countries such as the Democratic Republic of the Congo and Gabon.

The major areas of production in 2004 were coal (nearly two billion tons), iron ore (310 million tons), crude petroleum (175 million tons), natural gas (41 million cubic meters), antimony ore (110,000 tons), tin concentrates (110,000 tons), nickel ore (64,000 tons), tungsten concentrates (67,000 tons), unrefined salt (37 million tons), vanadium (40,000 tons), and molybdenum ore (29,000 tons). In order of magnitude, produced minerals were bauxite, gypsum, barite, magnesite, talc and related minerals, manganese ore, fluorspar, and zinc. In addition, China produced 2,450 tons of silver and 215 tons of gold in 2004. The mining sector accounted for less than 0.9% of total employment in 2002 but produced about 5.3% of total industrial production.

In 2019, the country was the world's largest producer of gold; 3rd largest world producer of copper; 3rd worldwide producer of silver; the world's largest producer of sulfur; the world's largest producer of phosphate; the world's largest producer of molybdenum; the world's largest producer of lead; largest world producer of zinc; the world's largest producer of vanadium; largest world producer of tin; the world's largest producer of titanium; the world's largest producer of antimony; 2nd largest worldwide producer of bauxite; 3rd largest world producer of iron ore; 6th largest world producer of manganese; 7th largest world producer of nickel; 10th largest world producer of cobalt; in addition to being the world's largest producer of salt. It was the world's 8th largest producer of uranium in 2018. Furthermore, it is the largest world producer of jade and one of the world producers of topaz, tourmaline, peridot and diamond.

Until the end of 2019, a total of 173 types of minerals have been discovered in China, including 13 types of energy materials, 59 metals, 95 types of non-metallic minerals and six types of water and gases.
In 2019, the newly discovered geological reserves of oil were 1.12 billion tonnes, of which, 160 million tonnes were proven technically recoverable reserves. The newly discovered geological reserves of shale gas were 764.42 billion cubic metres, of which, 183.84 billion cubic metres were proven reserves.
With respect to non-oil and gas minerals, the evaluation states that China has great prospecting potential for 24 major minerals, including coal, iron ore, manganese, chromite, copper, lead, zinc, bauxite, tungsten, tin, molybdenum, antimony, nickel, gold, silver, lithium, pyrites, phosphate rock, potash, magnesite, fluorite, boron and barite.

Hydroelectric resources

China has an abundant potential for hydroelectric power production due to its considerable river network and mountainous terrain. Most of the total hydroelectric capacity is situated in the southwest of the country, where coal supplies are poor but demand for energy is rising swiftly. The potential in the northeast is fairly small, but it was there that the first hydroelectric stations were builtby the Japanese during its occupation of Manchuria.

Thirteen years in construction at a cost of $24billion, the immense Three Gorges Dam across the Yangtze River was essentially completed in 2006 and produced more than 100TWh of energy in 2018.

Coal

China is well endowed with mineral resources, the most important of which is coal. China's mineral resources include large reserves of coal and iron ore, plus adequate to abundant supplies of nearly all other industrial minerals. Although coal deposits are widely scattered (some coal is found in every province), most of the total is located in the northern part of the country. The province of Shanxi, in fact, is thought to contain about half of the total; other important coal-bearing provinces include Heilongjiang, Liaoning, Jilin, Hebei, and Shandong. Apart from these northern provinces, significant quantities of coal are present in Sichuan, and there are some deposits of importance in Guangdong, Guangxi, Yunnan, and Guizhou. A large part of the country's reserves consists of good bituminous coal, but there are also large deposits of lignite. Anthracite is present in several places (especially Liaoning, Guizhou, and Henan), but overall it is not very significant.

To ensure a more even distribution of coal supplies and to reduce the strain on the less than adequate transportation network, the authorities pressed for the development of a large number of small, locally run mines throughout the country. This campaign was energetically pursued after the 1960s, with the result that thousands of small pits have been established, and they produce more than half the country's coal. This output, however, is typically expensive and is used for local consumption. It has also led to a less than stringent implementation of safety measures in these unregulated mines, which cause several thousands of deaths each year.

Coal makes up the bulk of China's energy consumption (70% in 2005, 55% in 2021), and China is the largest producer and consumer of coal in the world. As China's economy continues to grow, China's coal demand is projected to rise significantly. Although coal's share of China's overall energy consumption will decrease, coal consumption will continue to rise in absolute terms. China's continued and increasing reliance on coal as a power source has contributed significantly to putting China on the path to becoming the world's largest emitter of acid rain-causing sulfur dioxide and greenhouse gases, including carbon dioxide.

As of 2015, falling coal prices resulted in layoffs at coal mines in the northeast.

Oil and natural gas

China's onshore oil resources are mostly located in the Northeast and in Xinjiang, Gansu, Qinghai, Sichuan, Shandong, and Henan provinces. Oil shale is found in a number of places, especially at Fushun in Liaoning, where the deposits overlie the coal reserves, as well as in Guangdong. High quality light oil has been found in the Pearl River estuary of the South China Sea, the Qaidam Basin in Qinghai, and the Tarim Basin in Xinjiang. The country consumes most of its oil output but does export some crude oil and oil products. China has explored and developed oil deposits in the South China Sea and East China Sea, the Yellow Sea, the Gulf of Tonkin, and the Bohai Sea.

In 2013, the pace of China's economic growth exceeded the domestic oil capacity and floods damaged the nation's oil fields in the middle of the year. Consequently, China imported oil to compensate for the supply reduction and surpassed the US in September 2013 to become the world's largest importer of oil.

The total extent of China's natural gas reserves is unknown, as relatively little exploration for natural gas has been done. Sichuan accounts for almost half of the known natural gas reserves and production. Most of the rest of China's natural gas is associated gas produced in the Northeast's major oil fields, especially Daqing oilfield. Other gas deposits have been found in the Qaidam Basin, Hebei, Jiangsu, Shanghai, and Zhejiang, and offshore to the southwest of Hainan Island. According to an article published in Energy Economics in 2011 by economists Mete Feridun (University of Greenwich) and Abdul Jalil (Wuhan University in China), financial development in China has not taken place at the expense of environmental pollution and financial development has led to a decrease in environmental pollution. Authors conclude that carbon emissions are mainly determined by income, energy consumption and trade openness and their findings confirm the existence of an Environmental Kuznets Curve in the case of China.

Metals and nonmetals
Iron ore reserves are found in most provinces, including Hainan. Gansu, Guizhou, southern Sichuan, and Guangdong provinces have rich deposits. The largest mined reserves are located north of the Yangtze River and supply neighboring iron and steel enterprises. With the exception of nickel, chromium, and cobalt, China is well supplied with ferroalloys and manganese. Reserves of tungsten are also known to be fairly large. Copper resources are moderate, and high-quality ore is present only in a few deposits. Discoveries have been reported from Ningxia. Lead and zinc are available, and bauxite resources are thought to be plentiful. China's antimony reserves are the largest in the world. Tin resources are plentiful, and there are fairly rich deposits of gold. China is the world's fifth largest producer of gold and in the early 21st century became an important producer and exporter of rare metals needed in high-technology industries.

China also produces a fairly wide range of nonmetallic minerals. One of the most important of these is salt, which is derived from coastal evaporation sites in Jiangsu, Hebei, Shandong, and Liaoning, as well as from extensive salt fields in Sichuan, Ningxia, and the Qaidam Basin. There are important deposits of phosphate rock in a number of areas; Jiangxi, Guangxi, Yunnan and Hubei. Production has been accelerating every year. As of 2013 China is producing 97,000,000 metric tons of phosphate rock a year. Pyrites occur in several places; Liaoning, Hebei, Shandong, and Shanxi have the most important deposits. China also has large resources of fluorite (fluorspar), gypsum, asbestos, and has the world's largest reserves and production of cement, clinker and limestone.

Industry and manufacturing

, industry accounts for 40.5% of China's GDP. Between the years 2011 and 2013, China used more cement than the United States consumed during the entire 20th century. In 2009 around 8% of the total manufacturing output in the world came from China itself and China ranked third worldwide in industrial output that year (first was EU and second United States). Research by IHS Global Insight states that in 2010 China contributed to 19.8% of world's manufacturing output and became the largest manufacturer in the world that year, after the US had held that position for about 110 years.

In November 2012, the State Council of the People's Republic of China mandated a "social risk assessment" for all major industrial projects. This requirement followed mass public protests in some locations for planned projects or expansions.

Major industries include mining and ore processing; iron and steel; aluminium; coal; machinery; armaments; textiles and apparel; petroleum; cement; chemical; fertilizers; food processing; automobiles and other transportation equipment including rail cars and locomotives, ships, and aircraft; consumer products including footwear, toys, and electronics; telecommunications and information technology. China has become a preferred destination for the relocation of global manufacturing facilities. Its strength as an export platform has contributed to incomes and employment in China.

Since the founding of the People's Republic, industrial development has been given considerable attention; as of 2011 46% of China's national output continued to be devoted to investment; a percentage far higher than any other nation. Among the various industrial branches the machine-building and metallurgical industries have received the highest priority. These two areas alone now account for about 20–30 percent of the total gross value of industrial output. In these, as in most other areas of industry, however, innovation has generally suffered at the hands of a system that has rewarded increases in gross output rather than improvements in variety, sophistication and quality. China, therefore, still imports significant quantities of specialized steels. Overall industrial output has grown at an average rate of more than ten percent per year, having surpassed all other sectors in economic growth and degree of modernization. Some heavy industries and products deemed to be of national strategic importance remain state-owned, but an increasing proportion of lighter and consumer-oriented manufacturing firms are privately held or are private-state joint ventures.

The predominant focus of development in the chemical industry is to expand the output of chemical fertilizers, plastics, and synthetic fibers. The growth of this industry has placed China among the world's leading producers of nitrogenous fertilizers. In the consumer goods sector the main emphasis is on textiles and clothing, which also form an important part of China's exports. Textile manufacturing, a rapidly growing proportion of which consists of synthetics, account for about ten percent of the gross industrial output and continues to be important, but less so than before. The industry tends to be scattered throughout the country, but there are a number of important textile centers, including Shanghai, Guangzhou, and Harbin. There is a growing consumer culture in China.

Steel industry

In 2020, China produced over 1053 million tonnes of steel, over half of the world total. This was an increase of 5.6% over the previous year as global steel production fell by 0.9%. China's share of global crude steel production increased from 53.3% in 2019 to 56.5% in 2020

Iron ore production kept pace with steel production in the early 1990s but was soon outpaced by imported iron ore and other metals in the early 2000s. Steel production, an estimated 140 million tons in 2000 increased to 419 million tons in 2006 and 928 million tons by 2018. Much of the country's steel output comes from a large number of small-scale producing centers, one of the largest being Anshan in Liaoning.

China was the top exporter of steel in the world in 2018; export volumes in 2018 were 66.9 million tons, a nine percent decrease over the previous year. The decline slowed China's decade-old steel export growth. As of 2012 steel exports faced widespread anti-dumping taxes and had not returned to pre-2008 levels. However, in 2015, China's steel exports reached a record high of 110 million metric tons. Domestic demand remained strong, particularly in the developing west where steel production in Xinjiang was expanding.

For the year 2018, China's steel industry reported profits of CNY 470 billion ($70billion), which was 39% higher than the year before.

Of the 45 largest steel producing companies in the world, 21 are Chinese, including the world's largest, China Baowu Steel Group.

Automotive industry

China is the world's largest automobile producer, manufacturing more than 27 million vehicles in 2018. For comparison, the corresponding numbers for the US and Japan were 11.3 million and 9.7 million respectively. By 2006 China had become the world's third largest automotive vehicle manufacturer (after US and Japan) and the second largest consumer (only after the US). However, four years later, in 2010, China was manufacturing more vehicles than the U.S. and Japan combined. Automobile manufacturing has soared during the reform period. In 1975 only 139,800 automobiles were produced annually, but by 1985 production had reached 443,377, then jumped to nearly 1.1 million by 1992 and increased fairly evenly each year up until 2001, when it reached 2.3 million. In 2002 production rose to nearly 3.25 million and then jumped to 4.44 million in 2003, 5.07 million in 2004, 5.71 million in 2005, 7.28 million in 2006, 8.88 million in 2007, 9.35 million in 2008 and 13.83 million in 2009. China has become the number-one automaker in the world as of 2009. Domestic sales have kept pace with production. After respectable annual increases in the mid- and late 1990s, passenger car sales soared in the early 2000s. In 2006, a total of 7.22 million automobiles were sold, including 5.18 million units of passenger cars and 2.00 million commercial vehicles.

In 2010, China became the world's largest automotive vehicle manufacturer as well as the largest consumer ahead of the United States with an estimated 18 million new cars sold. However, new car sales grew only by an estimated 1% between 2011 and 2012 due to the escalation in the Spratly Islands dispute, which involved Japan, the world's third largest producer of vehicles.

China's automotive industry has been so successful that it began exporting car parts in 1999. China began to plan major moves into the automobile and components export business starting in 2005. A new Honda factory in Guangzhou was built in 2004 solely for the export market and was expected to ship 30,000 passenger vehicles to Europe in 2005. By 2004, twelve major foreign automotive manufacturers had joint-venture plants in China. They produced a wide range of automobiles, minivans, sport utility vehicles, buses, and trucks. In 2003 China exported US$4.7billion worth of vehicles and components. The vehicle export was 78,000 units in 2004, 173,000 units in 2005, and 340,000 units in 2006. The vehicle and component export is targeted to reach US$70billion by 2010.

The market for domestically produced cars, under a local name, is likely to continue to grow both inside China and outside. Companies such as Geely, Qiantu and Chery are constantly evaluating new international locations, both in developing and developed countries.

Electric vehicle industry 

The electric vehicle industry in China is the largest in the world, accounting for around 57.4% of global production of EVs and around 500,000 exports in 2021. In 2021, CAAM reported China had sold 3.34 million passenger electric vehicles, consisting 2.73 million BEVs (battery-only EVs) and 0.6 million PHEV (plug-in hybrid electric vehicles), which is around 53% share of the global market of 6.23 million "new energy" passenger vehicles – BEVs, PHEVs, and HEVs. China also dominates the plug-in electric bus and light commercial vehicle market, reaching over 500,000 buses (98% of global stock) and 247,500 electric commercial vehicles (65% of global stock) in 2019, and recording new sales of 186,000 commercial EVs in 2021.

Plug-in electric vehicle (BEV and PHEV) sales was 15% of the overall automotive sales in China in 2021. NEV adoption rapidly increased to a record 28% in March 2022, and according to BYD chairman Wang Chuanfu could reach 35% by end of 2022, exceeding the government goal of 20% by 2025. The plug-in market in China was dominated by Chinese companies, with BYD Auto and SAIC Motor occupying the top two spots, and 5 out of the top 7 spots.

The battery industry is closely related to the EV industry as batteries constitute around 1/3 of the cost of EVs and around 80% of lithium-ion batteries in the world are used in EVs. The industry also has significant Chinese presence, with major players including world's largest CATL, BYD, CALB, Gotion, SVOLT and WeLion.

Semiconductor industry

The Chinese semiconductor industry, including IC design and manufacturing, forms a major part of China's IT industry. China's semiconductor industry consists of a wide variety of companies, from integrated device manufacturers to pure-play foundries to fabless semiconductor companies. Integrated device manufacturers (IDMs) design and manufacture integrated circuits. Pure-play foundries foundries only manufacture devices for other companies, without designing them, while fabless semiconductor companies only design devices. Examples of Chinese IDMs are YMTC and CXMT, examples of Chinese pure-play foundries are SMIC, Hua Hong Semiconductor and Wingtech, and examples of Chinese fabless companies are Zhaoxin, HiSilicon and UNISOC.

China is the currently the world's largest semiconductor market in terms of consumption. In 2020, China represented 53.7% of worldwide chip sales, or $239.45 billion out of $446.1 billion. However, a large percentage are imported from multinational suppliers. In 2020, imports took up 83.38% ($199.7 billion) of total chip sales. In response, the country has launched a number of initiatives to close the gap, including investing $150 billion into its domestic IC industry, with a "Made in China 2025" goal of 70% domestic production.

China leads the world in terms of number of new fabs under construction, with 8 out of 19 worldwide in 2021, and 17 fabs in total are expected to start construction from 2021 to 2023. Total installed capacity of Chinese-owned chipmakers will also increase from 2.96 million wafers per month (wpm) in 2020 to 3.572 million wpm in 2021.

Other industries

Substantial investments were made in the manufacture of solar panels and wind generators by a number of companies, supported by liberal loans by banks and local governments. However, by 2012 manufacturing capacity had far outstripped domestic and global demand for both products, particularly solar panels, which were subjected to anti-dumping penalties by both the United States and Europe. The global oversupply has resulted in bankruptcies and production cutbacks both inside and outside China. China has budgeted $50billion to subsidize production of solar power over the two decades following 2015 but, even at the sharply reduced price resulting from oversupply, as of 2012 cost of solar power in China remained three times that of power produced by conventional coal-fired power plants.

China is the world's biggest sex toy producer and accounts for 70% of the worldwide sex toys production. In the country, 1,000 manufacturers are active in this industry, which generates about two billion dollars a year.

As of 2011, China was the world's largest market for personal computers Since 2019, Samsung Electronics, Hyundai Motors, Kia Motors and LG Electronics are moving some or all production out of China, in order to reduce overdependence on the Chinese market and avoid risks related with increased local competition, China's economic slowdown and the US-China trade war.

Services
The output of China's services in 2015 ranks second worldwide after the United States. High power and telecom density has ensured that the country has remained on a high-growth trajectory over the long term. In 2015 the services sector produced 52.9% of China's annual GDP, second only to manufacturing. However, its proportion of GDP is still low compared to the ratio in more developed countries, and the agricultural sector still employs a larger workforce.

Prior to the onset of economic reforms in 1978, China's services sector was characterized by state-operated shops, rationing, and regulated priceswith reform came private markets, individual entrepreneurs, and a commercial sector. The wholesale and retail trade has expanded quickly, with numerous shopping malls, retail shops, restaurant chains and hotels constructed in urban areas. Public administration remains a main component of the service sector, while tourism has become a significant factor in employment and a source of foreign exchange.

Telecommunications

China possesses a diversified communications system that links all parts of the country by Internet, telephone, telegraph, radio, and television.

China's number of Internet users or netizens topped 137 million by the end of 2006, an increase of 23.4% from a year before and 162 million by June 2007, making China the second-largest Internet user after the United States, according to China's Ministry of Information Industry (MII). China's mobile phone penetration rate was 34% in 2007. In 2006, mobile phone users sent 429 billion text messages (on average 967 text messages per user). For 2006, the number of fixed-lines grew by 79%, mainly in the rural areas.

Tourism

China hosts the world's largest number of World Heritage Sites (55). China's tourism industry is one of the fastest-growing industries in the national economy and is also one of the industries with a very distinct global competitive edge. According to the World Travel and Tourism Council, travel and tourism directly contributed CNY 1,362 billion (US$216billion) to the Chinese economy (about 2.6% of GDP). In 2011, total international tourist arrivals was 58 million, and international tourism receipts were US$48billion.

Domestic tourism market makes up more than 90% of the country's tourism traffic, and contributes more than 70% of total tourism revenue. In 2002, domestic tourists reached 878 million and tourism revenue was $46.9billion. A large middle class with strong consumption power is emerging in China, especially in major cities. China's outbound tourists reached 20.22 million in 2003, overtaking Japan for the first time.

It is forecast by the World Tourism Organization that China's tourism industry will take up to 8.6% of world market share to become the world's top tourism industry by 2020.

Chinese business travel spending is also forecast to be the highest in the world by 2014, overtaking the United States. According to a Global Business Travel Association study, total business-travel spending is expected to reach US$195billion in 2012.

Luxury goods

Luxury spending in China has skyrocketed, an indicator of the country's newfound wealth. For example, the Chinese bottled water industry is forecast to more than double in size in 2008, becoming a $10.5billion industry. Counterfeiting is now estimated to account for 8% of China's gross
domestic product. Many municipalities and towns in China depend upon counterfeiting to sustain their local economies. There are millions of people, perhaps tens of millions of people, involved in counterfeiting in China. There are hundreds of thousands of people involved in anti-counterfeiting.  Meanwhile, as those who once had no recourse but low-quality tap water take advantage of its availability in supermarkets, those who had little or no running water are now capitalizing on its availability. Tap water production and supply is expected to grow by 29.3% in 2008, to $11.9billion. China's automotive industry is expected to expand by 29.5% to nearly $200billion. Also, consumption of chocolate and other confectionery is to increase by 24.3%, as the industry expands to $4.6billion. Additionally China's fast food industry has been growing at a 20.8% annual rate. The LVMH Group, who own brands including Louis Vuitton apparel, Moët & Chandon wines and champagne and Hennessy cognacs, reported earnings growth of over 25% in 2007 in China, with the country accounting for around 16% of LVMH's global business.

After an October 2012 ban on government agencies purchasing luxury goods, often used as "gifts", sales of luxury goods in China remained strong but slowed, even falling slightly for some luxury retailers in the 4th quarter of 2012, with sales of shark fins and edible swallow nests (once staples of lavish government banquets) down sharply.

Retail sales in China account for only 7% of global retail sales; however, Chinese buyers account for 25% of global retail sales of luxury consumer goods. Many shops in international travel destinations have specialized staff devoted to Chinese customers.

Cybercrime
An academic study released in August 2012 by the University of California (UC) Institute on Global Conflict and Cooperation, claimed that China's "cyber black market" involved over 90,000 participants, cost the local economy 5.36 billion yuan (£536m), negatively impacted upon 110 million internet users (22%), and affected 1.1 million websites (20%) in 2011. In July 2012, China's State Council released a set of information security guidelines as a measure to combat cyber crime that included increased auditing, security reporting, and monitoring, and a commitment to "reduce the number of internet connection points".

Labor and welfare

One of the hallmarks of China's socialist economy was its promise of employment to all able and willing to work and job-security with virtually lifelong tenure. This socialist policy is known as the iron rice bowl.

In 1979–1980, the state reformed factories by giving wage increases to workers, which was immediately offset by sharply rising inflation rates of 6–7%. The reforms also dismantled the iron rice bowl, which meant it witnessed a rise in unemployment in the economy. In 1979–80 there were twenty million unemployed people.

China's estimated employed labor force in 2005 totaled 791 million persons, about 60% of the total population. During 2003, 49% of the labor force worked in agriculture, forestry, and fishing; 22% in mining, manufacturing, energy, and construction industries; and 29% in the services sector and other categories. In 2004 some 25 million persons were employed by 743,000 private enterprises. Urban wages rose rapidly from 2004 to 2007, at a rate of 13 to 19% per year with average wages near $200/month in 2007. By 2016 the average monthly wage for workers engaged in manufacturing goods for export was $424. This wage, combined with other costs of doing business in China, had, more or less, equalized any Chinese cost advantage with respect to developed economies.

The All-China Federation of Trade Unions is the country's only legally-permissible trade union. Attempts to form trade unions independent of the ACFTU have been rare and short-lived. One notable example is the Beijing Workers' Autonomous Federation formed during the 1989 Tiananmen Square protests. Martial Law Command Headquarters issued a public notice declaring the BWAF an illegal organization and ordering it to disband on the grounds that Federation leaders were among "the main instigators and organizers in the capital of the counterrevolutionary rebellion.

In 2010, the issues of manufacturing wages caused a wildcat strike at a Honda parts plant. This resulted in wage increases both at the struck plant and other industrial plants.

The 2010 census found that China was now half urban and rapidly aging due to the one child policy. This is expected to lead to increased demand for labor to take care of an elderly population and a reduced supply of migrant labor from the countryside.

Due to worsening pollution, the corruption and political uncertainties of the one-party state and the limited economic freedom in an economy dominated by large state-owned enterprises, many skilled professionals are either leaving the country or preparing safety nets for themselves abroad. In the decade up to 2014, ten million Chinese emigrated to other countries, taking assets and their technical skills. Perceived corruption continued to grow worse in China as it dropped from 75th to 80th place in Transparency International's index of state corruption.

A law approved February 2013 will mandate a nationwide minimum wage at 40% average urban salaries to be phased in fully by 2015.

External trade

International trade makes up a sizeable portion of China's overall economy. China became a member of the World Trade Organization in 2001. It also has free trade agreements with several nations, including ASEAN, Australia, Cambodia, New Zealand, Pakistan, South Korea and Switzerland. China's largest trading partners are the United States, the European Union, Japan, Hong Kong, South Korea, India, Taiwan, Australia, Vietnam, Malaysia, and Brazil.

During the Cold War, a meaningful segment of China's trade with the Third World was financed through grants, credits, and other forms of assistance. The principal efforts were made in Asia, especially to Indonesia, Myanmar, Pakistan, and Sri Lanka, but large loans were also granted in Africa (Ghana, Algeria, Tanzania) and in the Middle East (Egypt). However, after Mao Zedong's death in 1976, these efforts were scaled back. After which, trade with developing countries became negligible, though during that time, Hong Kong and Taiwan both began to emerge as major trading partners.

Since economic reforms began in the late 1970s, China sought to decentralize its foreign trade system to integrate itself into the international trading system. In November 1991, China joined the Asia-Pacific Economic Cooperation (APEC) group, which promotes free trade and cooperation in the economic, trade, investment, and technology spheres. China served as APEC chair in 2001, and Shanghai hosted the annual APEC leaders meeting in October of that year.

After reaching a bilateral WTO agreement with the EU and other trading partners in summer 2000, China worked on a multilateral WTO accession package. China concluded multilateral negotiations on its accession to the WTO in September 2001. The completion of its accession protocol and Working Party Report paved the way for its entry into the WTO on 11 December 2001, after 16 years of negotiations, the longest in the history of the General Agreement on Tariffs and Trade. However, U.S. exporters continue to have concerns about fair market access due to China's restrictive trade policies and U.S. export restrictions. In October 2019, Chinese Vice Premier Han Zheng promised to further decrease tariffs and remove non-tariff barriers for global investors, he also welcomed multinational companies to invest more in China.

China's global trade exceeded $4.16trillion at the end of 2013, having broken the hundred-billion mark in 1988 and half a trillion by 2001.  China global trade exceeded US$6 Trillion in 2021
The table below shows the average annual growth (in nominal USdollar terms) of China's foreign trade during the reform era.

The vast majority of China's imports consists of industrial supplies and capital goods, notably machinery and high-technology equipment, the majority of which comes from the developed countries, primarily Japan and the United States. Regionally, almost half of China's imports come from East and Southeast Asia, and about a fourth of China's exports go to the same destinations. About 80 percent of China's exports consist of manufactured goods, most of which are textiles and electronic equipment, with agricultural products and chemicals constituting the remainder. Out of the five busiest ports in the world, three are in China. The U.S. trade deficit with China reached $233billion in 2006, as imports grew 18%. China's share of total U.S. imports has grown from 7% to 15% since 1996.

Trade volume between China and Russia reached $29.1billion in 2005, an increase of 37.1% compared with 2004. A spokesman for the Ministry of Commerce, Van Jingsun, said that the volume of trade between China and Russia could exceed forty billion dollars in 2007. China's export of machinery and electronic goods to Russia grew 70%, which is 24% of China's total export to Russia in the first eleven months of 2005. During the same time, China's export of high-tech products to Russia increased by 58%, and that is 7% of China's total exports to Russia. Also at that time period, border trade between the two countries reached $5.13billion, growing 35% and accounting for nearly 20% of the total trade. Most of China's exports to Russia remain apparel and footwear. Russia is China's eighth largest trade partner and China is now Russia's fourth largest trade partner, and China now has over 750 investment projects in Russia, involving $1.05billion. China's contracted investment in Russia totaled $368million during January–September 2005, twice that in 2004.

Chinese imports from Russia are mainly those of energy sources, such as crude oil, which is mostly transported by rail, and electricity exports from neighboring Siberian and Far Eastern regions. In the near future, exports of both of these commodities are set to increase, as Russia is building the Eastern Siberia-Pacific Ocean oil pipeline with a branch going to the Chinese border, and Russian power grid monopoly UES is building some of its hydropower stations with a view of future exports to China.

Export growth has continued to be a major component supporting China's rapid economic growth. To increase exports, China pursued policies such as fostering the rapid development of foreign-invested factories, which assembled imported components into consumer goods for export and liberalizing trading rights. In its 11th Five-Year Program, adopted in 2005, China placed greater emphasis on developing a consumer demand-driven economy to sustain economic growth and address imbalances.

China is a member of the Regional Comprehensive Economic Partnership (RCEP), the world's largest free-trade area which was signed into agreement in November 2020. The RCEP, which includes China, Japan, South Korea, Australia, New Zealand and the ASEAN nations, represents about a third of the world's population and 29% of global gross domestic product. The RCEP aims to eliminate tariffs on a variety of products within 20 years. In May 2020, Chinese Premier Li Keqiang said that China is willing to consider joining another large Asia-Pacific free-trade pact, the Comprehensive and Progressive Agreement for Trans-Pacific Partnership (CPTPP).

Foreign investment

Direct foreign investment in China, which totaled about US$1.6trillion as of the end of October 2016, directly and indirectly contributed about one-third of China's GDP and a quarter of jobs there. As of the end of June 2020, FDI stock in China reached US$2.947trillion, and China's outgoing FDI stock stood at US$2.128trillion. The total foreign financial assets owned by China reached US$7.860trillion, and its foreign financial liabilities US$5.716trillion, making China the second largest creditor nation after Japan in the world.

China's investment climate has changed dramatically with more than two decades of reform. In the early 1980s, China restricted foreign investments to export-oriented operations and required foreign investors to form joint-venture partnerships with Chinese firms. The Encouraged Industry Catalogue sets out the degree of foreign involvement allowed in various industry sectors. From the beginning of the reforms legalizing foreign investment, capital inflows expanded every year until 1999. Foreign-invested enterprises account for 58–60% of China's imports and exports.

Since the early 1990s, the government has allowed foreign investors to manufacture and sell a wide range of goods on the domestic market, eliminated time restrictions on the establishment of joint ventures, provided some assurances against nationalization, allowed foreign partners to become chairs of joint venture boards, and authorized the establishment of wholly foreign-owned enterprises, now the preferred form of FDI. In 1991, China granted more preferential tax treatment for Wholly Foreign Owned Enterprises and contractual ventures and for foreign companies, which invested in selected economic zones or in projects encouraged by the state, such as energy, communications and transportation.

China also authorized some foreign banks to open branches in Shanghai and allowed foreign investors to purchase special "B" shares of stock in selected companies listed on the Shanghai and Shenzhen Securities Exchanges. These "B" shares sold to foreigners carried no ownership rights in a company. In 1997, China approved 21,046 foreign investment projects and received over $45billion in foreign direct investment. China revised significantly its laws on Wholly Foreign-Owned Enterprises and China Foreign Equity Joint Ventures in 2000 and 2001, easing export performance and domestic content requirements. The Vice Minister of Finance Zhu Guangyao announced, foreign investors will be allowed to own up to 51% on domestic financial service companies. Formerly foreign ownership was limited to a 49% stake in these firms.

Foreign investment remains a strong element in China's rapid expansion in world trade and has been an important factor in the growth of urban jobs. China's economic leadership on global capital flows emphasizes long-term infrastructure and development finance over short-term flows which, under the current order, have imposed large costs on many economies. In 1998, foreign-invested enterprises produced about 40% of China's exports, and foreign exchange reserves totalled about $145billion. Foreign-invested enterprises today produce about half of China's exports (the majority of China's foreign investment come from Hong Kong, Macau and Taiwan), and China continues to attract large investment inflows. However, the Chinese government's emphasis on guiding FDI into manufacturing has led to market saturation in some industries, while leaving China's services sectors underdeveloped. From 1993 to 2001, China was the world's second-largest recipient of foreign direct investment (FDI) after the United States, receiving $39billion in 1999 and $41billion in 2000. China is now one of the leading FDI recipients in the world, receiving almost $80billion in 2005 according to World Bank statistics. In 2006, China received $69.47billion. By 2011, with the U.S. seeing a decline in foreign investment following the 2008 financial crisis, China overtook it as the top destination for FDI, receiving over $280billion that year.

Amid slowing economic conditions and a weakening yuan in 2015, December of that year saw a 5.8% drop in FDI to China. While China's rank as the top receiver of FDI continued through 2014, the slowing of inbound investment in 2015 combined with a massive rebound in foreign investment to the United States resulted in the U.S. reclaiming its position as the top investment destination. Data from the American Chamber of Commerce in China's 2016 China Business Climate Survey confirms this trend, although it also demonstrates that China remains a top investment destination. This survey of over 500 members found that "China remains a top three investment priority for six out of ten member companies," though this is a decline from the 2012 high of eight out of ten respondents considering China a top priority.

Foreign exchange reserves totaled $155billion in 1999 and $165billion in 2000. Foreign exchange reserves exceeded $800billion in 2005, more than doubling from 2003. Foreign exchange reserves were $819billion at the end of 2005, $1.066trillion at the end of 2006, $1.9trillion by June 2008. In addition, by the end of September 2008 China replaced Japan for the first time as the largest foreign holder of US treasury securities with a total of $585billion, vs Japan $573billion. China's foreign exchange reserves are the largest in the world.

As part of its WTO accession, China undertook to eliminate certain trade-related investment measures and to open up specified sectors that had previously been closed to foreign investment. New laws, regulations, and administrative measures to implement these commitments are being issued. Major remaining barriers to foreign investment include opaque and inconsistently enforced laws and regulations and the lack of a rules-based legal infrastructure. Warner Bros., for instance, withdrew its cinema business in China as a result of a regulation that requires Chinese investors to own at least a 51 percent stake or play a leading role in a foreign joint venture.

Another major development in the history of foreign investment in China was the establishment of the Shanghai Free Trade Zone in September 2013. The Zone is considered a testing ground for a number of economic and social reforms. Critically, foreign investment is controlled via a "negative list" approach, where FDI is permitted in all sectors unless explicitly prohibited by the inclusion of a given sector on the negative list published by the Shanghai Municipal Government.

On 15 March 2019, China's National People's Congress adopted the Foreign Investment Law, which comes into effect on 1January 2020. Foreign investment in China comes with a number of ethical risks which pose major challenges which investors must navigate.

A 2021 McKinsey report estimated that the Chinese economy as currently the largest consumer economy measured in purchasing power parity (PPP) terms, and that it is expected to add more consumption than any other country within the next decade. Due to this and the rapid continued growth of China's middle class, large multinational companies like Walmart, have been keen to invest in China to tap into the growing domestic consumer market.

Chinese investment abroad

Outward foreign direct investment is a new feature of Chinese globalization, where local Chinese firms seek to make investments in both developing and developed countries. It was reported in 2011 that there was increasing investment by capital rich Chinese firms in promising firms in the United States. Such investments offer access to expertise in marketing and distribution potentially useful in exploiting the developing Chinese domestic market.

Since 2005, Chinese companies have been actively expanding outside of China, in both developed and developing countries. In 2013, Chinese companies invested US$90billion globally in non-financial sectors, 16% more than 2012.

Between January 2009 and December 2013, China contributed a total of $161.03bn in outward FDI, creating almost 300,000 jobs. Western Europe was the largest regional recipient of Chinese outward FDI, with Germany receiving the highest number of FDI projects for any country globally.

There are two ways Chinese companies choose to enter a foreign market: organic growth and Merge & Acquisition (M&A). Many Chinese companies would prefer M&A for the following reasons:
 Fast. M&A is the fastest way for a company to expand into another country by acquiring brand, distribution, talents, and technology. Chinese CEOs has been used to growing at 50%+ speed and do not want to spend capital.
 China market. China has become the world's largest economy. Many Chinese acquire foreign companies and then bring their products/services to China, anything from premium cars to fashion clothing to meat to Hollywood movies.
 Cheap capital access. The huge Chinese domestic market help many Chinese companies accumulated financial capital to do M&A. Chinese government also provides long-term, low-interest capital for companies to expand abroad.
 Low risk. M&A helped Chinese companies avoid risk of failure of organic growth as they got an established company with everything in place.
 Cheap labor. Some companies may move part of the manufacturing in high labor cost countries to China to reduce the cost and make the product more attractive in price.
 Trade and policy barrier. Chinese companies in many sectors face quota limitation and high tax, which prevent them from being competitive in foreign markets.
 Depressed assets. 2008–2010 global economic crisis created liquidity problems for a lot of western companies and reduced their market value. Chinese companies believe it is a great opportunity for them to buy these depressed assets at discount. China's direct foreign investment in non-financial sector growth from US$25billion in 2007 to US$90billion in 2013, more than three times.
China is growing in investments and influencing power over Europe, and the EU has begun to take notice.

At the beginning, state-owned enterprises dominate the foreign acquisition and most of the money goes to oil and minerals. Since 2005, more and more private companies start to acquire non-raw material foreign companies. Below is a list of the top 15 outbound deals from Chinese companies:

However, the fast growth and M&A deals did not change consumers' low quality and low price perception of Chinese goods and brands. According to market consecutive researches by the Monogram Group, a Chicago-based advertising agency, in 2007, 2009, 2011 and 2012, American consumers' willingness to purchase Chinese products across all categories except PC remained the same or became worse during 2007–2012. The only sector in which Americans were more likely to purchase was personal computers.

Moreover, many M&A deals have failed because companies underestimated the challenges and failed to restructure the company.

Case 1: Shanghai Auto acquired 48.9% of Korean Ssangyong at US$500million in 2004, making it the most ambitious acquisition in Chinese auto industry at the time. Shanghai Auto wanted the brand and technology to expand its footprint in China. However, the cultural difference, the objection to transfer the technology and the failed sales of new SUV model put Shanghai Auto's ambition of expansion in jeopardy. It caused huge conflict between Ssangyong employees and Shanghai Auto as things didn't go well as planned. And the 2008 global economic crisis put Ssangyong on a survival mode, let alone expansion. After the negotiation with the labor union to reduce wages failed, Shanghai Auto decided to exit from Ssangyong and didn't get a penny back for their US$500million investment.

Case 2: In 2004, the television manufacturer TCL acquired TV business including Thomson and RCA brand from Thomson Electronics of France to form a joint venture called TCL–Thomson Electronics (TTE). For the coming two years, the company recorded huge loss, especially in Europe. Several factors contributed to the failure:
 Failure of Due Diligence. Right after TCL acquired Thomson's TV business, the TV market shifted to LCD technology, put Thomson out of date. As CEO of TCL, Dongsheng Li, said in 2012 "They betted on the wrong thing where the market would go. They thought Thomson's DLP could be the best choice."
 Lack of understanding of rules and regulations. According to the book Resumption of Trading by Chong Chen, soon after acquisition, Thomson found it in a situation that they couldn't recruit the talents they wanted and can't fire ones they didn't want.
 Underestimate of the challenges in cultural difference. Xuesong Tong, vice president of TTE, said in an interview with "China Operation" newspaper in 2005: "The French look down upon their Chinese boss. For example, they wanted to share the design model with TTE, but French just dislike it even though it is a popular one in US market. Also, French feel superior in their language and don't want to speak English, which created huge problem in communication. It takes hours to discuss simple issues and can't reach agreement."
 According to Scott Markman, president of Monogram, Chinese companies often moved their business model to developed countries and it doesn't work. Thomson has the problem, they are very good and distribution and operation in China but France and Europe is a totally different world.

Mergers and acquisitions
From 1993 to 2010, Chinese companies have been involved as either an acquiror or acquired company in 25,284 mergers and acquisitions with a total known value of US$969billion. The number and value of deals hit a new record in 2010. The number of deals that happened in 2010 has been 3,640, which is an increase of 17% compared to 2009. The value of deals in 2010 was US$196billion, which is an increase of 25% compared to the year before.

Demographics 

Since the 1950s medical care, public hygiene and sanitation improved considerably, and epidemics were controlled. Consecutive generations continuously experienced better health. The population growth rate surged as the mortality rate dropped more rapidly than the birth rate. China's massive population has always been a major difficulty for the government as it has struggled to provide for it. In the 1950s, food supply was inadequate and the standard of living was generally low. This spurred the authorities to initiate a major birth control program. The Great Leap Forward industrial plan in 1958–60 was partially responsible for a huge famine that caused the death rate to surpass the birth rate, and by 1960, the overall population was declining. A second population control drive began in 1962 with major efforts focused on promoting late marriages and the use of contraceptives. By 1963 the country was in the beginning of recovery from the famine and the birth rate soared to its highest since 1949 with an annual population growth rate of 3%. In 1966, the Cultural Revolution suspended this second family planning program, but resumed four years later with the third attempt by making later marriage and family size limitation an obligation. Since 1970, the efforts have been much more effective. The third family planning program continued until 1979 when the one child per family policy was implemented. By the early 1980s, China's population reached around a billion, and by the early 2000s surpassed 1.3 billion. In the 1980s, the average overall population growth was around 1.5%. In the 1990s, this fell to about 1%. Today it is about 0.6%. China's population growth rate is now among the lowest for a developing country, although, due to its large population, annual net population growth is still considerable. One demographic consequence of the one-child policy is that China is now one of the most rapidly ageing countries in the world.

From 100 million to 150 million surplus rural workers are adrift between the villages and the cities, many subsisting through part-time, low-paying jobs.

According to a Forbes China Rich List (2007), China had 66 billionaires, the second largest number after the United States, which had 415. In the 2006 Forbes Rich List it stated that there were 15 Chinese billionaires. In the 2007 Hurun Report, it lists 106 billionaires in China. According to the latest Forbes report (2021), China has a total of 626 billionaires, after gaining 239 new billionaires since March 2020.

According to a 2020 Brookings report, China become the largest middle-class consumption market in the world and is deemed a "priority market" for major multinational firm. It also estimates that 1.2 billion Chinese will be part of the middle class by 2027, and makeup a quarter of the world's middle class.

Labor force
In 2012, for the first time, according to statistics released by China's National Bureau of Statistics in January 2013, the size of the labor force, people aged 15 to 59, in China shrank slightly to 937.27 million people, a decrease of 3.45 million from 2011. This trend, resulting from China's one-child policy of population control, is anticipated to continue to at least 2030.

On 29 October 2015, Xinhua, China's state news agency, reported a change in the existing law to a two-child policy, citing a statement from the CCP, and the new law is effective from 1January 2016 after it was passed in the standing committee of the National People's Congress on 27 December 2015.

Transportation and infrastructure

China's transportation policy, influenced by political, military, and economic concerns, have undergone major changes since 1949.

Immediately after the People's Republic was founded, the primary goal was to repair existing transportation infrastructure in order to meet military transport and logistics needs as well as to strengthen territorial integrity. During most of the 1950s, new road and rail links were built, while at the same time old ones were improved. During the 1960s much of the improvement of regional transportation became the responsibility of the local governments, and many small railways were constructed. Emphasis was also placed on developing transportation in remote rural, mountainous, and forested areas, in order to integrate poorer regions of the country and to help promote economies of scale in the agricultural sector.

Before the reform era began in the late 1970s, China's transportation links were mostly concentrated in the coastal areas and access to the inner regions was generally poor. This situation has been improved considerably since then, as railways and highways have been built in the remote and frontier regions of the northwest and southwest. At the same time, the development of international transportation was also pursued, and the scope of ocean shipping was broadened considerably.

Freight haulage is mainly provided by rail transport. The rail sector is monopolized by China Railway and there is wide variation in services provided. In late 2007 China became one of the few countries in the world to launch its own indigenously developed high-speed train. As rail capacity is struggling to meet demand for the transport of goods and raw materials such as coal, air routes, roads and waterways are rapidly being developed to provide an increasing proportion of China's overall transportation needs.

Some economic experts have argued that the development gap between China and other emerging economies such as Brazil, Argentina and India can be attributed to a large extent to China's early focus on ambitious infrastructure projects: while China invested roughly 9% of its GDP on infrastructure in the 1990s and 2000s, most emerging economies invested only 2% to 5% of their GDP. This considerable spending gap allowed the Chinese economy to grow at near optimal conditions while many South American economies suffered from various development bottlenecks such as poor transportation networks, aging power grids and mediocre schools.

Science and technology 

Science and technology in China has in recent decades developed rapidly. The Chinese government has placed emphasis through funding, reform, and societal status on science and technology as a fundamental part of the socio-economic development of the country as well as for national prestige. China has made rapid advances in areas such as education, infrastructure, high-tech manufacturing, artificial intelligence, academic publishing, patents and commercial applications. China is now increasingly targeting indigenous innovation and aims to reform remaining weaknesses. Its Thousand Talents Plan aims to attract innovative Chinese academics living abroad (as well as a some foreigners) back to China in support of its economic innovation goals.

Anti-monopoly and competition 
The Chinese economy has been characterized as being dominated by few, larger entities including Ant Group and Tencent. In recent years there has been attempts by the Xi Jinping Administration to enforce economic competition rules, and probes into Alibaba and Tencent have been launched by Chinese economic regulators.

The crackdown on monopolies by tech giants and internet companies follows with recent calls by the Politburo against monopolistic practices by commercial retail giants like Alibaba. Comparisons have been made with similar probes into Amazon in the United States.

See also

Notes

References

Further reading 

 Sit Tsui, Erebus Wong, Lau Kin Chi and Wen Tiejun. One Belt, One Road: China's Strategy for a New Global Financial Order (January 2017), Monthly Review, Volume 68, Issue 08
 Cheng Enfu and Ding Xiaoqin. A Theory of China's 'Miracle': Eight Principles of Contemporary Chinese Political Economy (January 2017), Monthly Review, Volume 68, Issue 08
 
 China: Country StudiesFederal Research Division, Library of Congress. Lcweb2.loc.gov (27 July 2010)
 
 

 Journals
 China Economic Journal Taylor & Francis Journals: Welcome. Tandf.co.uk. Retrieved on 6 August 2010.
 China Economic Quarterly
 China & World Economy China & World EconomyJournal Information. Blackwellpublishing.com (2010-05-07). Retrieved on 6 August 2010.
 Journal of Chinese Economic and Business Studies (JCEBS) Taylor & Francis Journals: Welcome. Tandf.co.uk. Retrieved on 6 August 2010. is the official journal of the Chinese Economic Association (UK). CEA PublicationsJournal of Chinese Economic and Business Studies. Ceauk.org.uk. Retrieved on 6 August 2010.
 Journal of Chinese Economic and Foreign Trade Studies Emerald, Journal of Chinese Economic and Foreign Trade Studies information. Emeraldinsight.com. Retrieved on 6 August 2010.
 The China Quarterly Journals.cambridge.org
 The Chinese Economy M. E. Sharpe, Inc.Journal Information. Mesharpe.com. Retrieved on 6 August 2010.
 Journal of Chinese Economic Studies (ISSN 1348-2521)
 Journal of the Chinese Statistical Association (ISSN 0529-6528)
 China: An International Journal (ISSN 0219-7472)
 China Economic Review (ISSN 1043-951X)
 China Review (ISSN 1680-2012)
 Frontiers of Economics in China (ISSN 1673-3444)
 China 2030: Building a Modern, Harmonious, and Creative High-Income Society (pre-publication version)
 Citation: "World Bank; Development Research Center of the State Council, P.R.C. 2012. China 2030 : Building a Modern, Harmonious, and Creative High-Income Society [pre-publication version]. Washington, DC: World Bank. China 2030 : Building a Modern, Harmonious, and Creative High-Income Society [pre-publication version] License: Creative Commons license CC BY 3.0 Unported."
 URI: China 2030 : Building a Modern, Harmonious, and Creative High-Income Society [pre-publication version]
 Date: 2012-02-27
 Author(s): World Bank; Development Research Center of the State Council, P.R.C.
 China 2030

 
Government-owned companies of China
China